Heart: A History is a 2018 book by Sandeep Jauhar. In the book Jauhar discusses the historical experiments and procedures done in the past and how innovations can be taken for granted.


Plot
The book begins with Jauhar discussing his personal health and family history, focusing on heart-related issues. He gives his opinion and talks about the advances in technology that have come about in the past few decades and how they have shaped the way doctors practice cardiology today.  Jauhar also discusses the old views that people had about the heart and why this was the last organ that was operated upon due to cultural perspectives and the level of difficulty.  He further notes several of his personal experiences as a cardiologist and states that the heart is still the center of attention of the body. Jauhar mentions research and experiments conducted on animals and humans, which he sees as unethical by modern standards while stating that without them society would not have the experience or procedures that are currently used.

Jauhar also covers the effects of emotions on the heart and how he believes stressors can significantly damage a person's heart. He states that doctors have lowered the risk of dying from a heart attack in a hospital to 3 percent, which he does not believe can be improved much further. He notes the difficulty for physicians to help patients prevent common stressors and that it has become easy to prescribe medicine for cholesterol. Finally, Jauhar advises that yoga, meditation, and activities that help emotions should be taught in schools and the medical field.

Critical reception

Critical reception for the book has been positive, and received reviews from The New Statesman, The Globe and Mail, and Financial Express. The Washington Post and Business Standard both wrote favorable reviews, with the former stating that it was "a fascinating education for those of us who harbor this most hallowed organ but know little about it.”

References

Heart
Cardiology
Books about health
History of medicine